Jack Bannister (born 26 January 1942 in Chesterfield, Derbyshire, England), is an English former footballer who played as a wing half in the Football League. He made a total of 253 appearances for West Bromwich Albion, Scunthorpe United, Crystal Palace, Luton Town and Cambridge United before moving into non-league football with Dunstable Town.

Playing career

Bannister began his youth career at West Bromwich Albion and went on to a senior career at the club, but after only nine league appearances over four seasons, signed for Scunthorpe United in 1964. However, after only a further nine appearances he signed for Crystal Palace on 1 July 1965. In 1965–66, Bannister made 22 appearances, but in the two subsequent seasons missed only one game. In 1969, Palace were promoted to the top tier for the first time, but Bannister played only 15 times, in the early part of the promotion season, and in October 1968, was transferred to Luton Town. He made 83 appearances over two seasons for Luton, before finishing his league career at Cambridge United (32 appearances). He then moved into non-league football with Dunstable Town.

References

External links

Jack Bannister at holmesdale.net

1942 births
Living people
English footballers
Footballers from Chesterfield
Association football midfielders
West Bromwich Albion F.C. players
Scunthorpe United F.C. players
Crystal Palace F.C. players
Luton Town F.C. players
Cambridge United F.C. players
English Football League players
Dunstable Town F.C. players